The 20923 / 20924 Tirunelveli - Gandhidham Humsafar Express is a superfast express train belonging to Western Railway zone that runs between  and  in India.

It was announced to be operated with 19423/19424 train numbers on weekly basis.

The inaugural special service of Gandhidham - Tirunelveli Humsafar Express (09424) was flagged off by Minister of States of Railways Rajen Gohain on 5 July 2018. The regular service started from 16th of that month.

Service

The 20923 Tirunelveli - Gandhidham Humsafar Express leaves  at 05:15AM on Thursday and reaches  at 02:25AM on Saturday.

The 20924 Gandhidham - Tirunelveli Humsafar Express leaves  at 04:40 AM on Monday and reaches  at 02:05 AM on Wednesday.

Route & Halts

Traction
This train is hauled by Vatva based WDM 3A / WDM 3D locomotive from  till  after which a Erode based WAP 4 or WAP 7 locomotive power the train until  and vice versa.

Coach Composition 

The  Tirunelveli – Gandhidham Humsafar Express  operates  with  3-Tier AC  coaches and sleeper class coaches with LED screens to display information about stations, train speed etc. and has  announcement system as well, Vending machines for tea, coffee and milk, Bio toilets in compartments as well as CCTV cameras.

The coach composition of 19423 Tirunelveli – Gandhidham Humsafar Express.

See also 

 Humsafar Express

Notes

References 

Humsafar Express trains
Transport in Tirunelveli
Transport in Gandhidham
Rail transport in Kerala
Rail transport in Gujarat
Railway services introduced in 2017